Russell William Earl is a visual effects supervisor. He has been nominated for five Academy Awards and two British Academy Film Awards, among other awards.

Oscar history

All five of these are in the category of Best Visual Effects.

80th Academy Awards-Nominated for Transformers. Nomination shared with Scott Benza, Scott Farrar and John Knoll. Lost to The Golden Compass.
82nd Academy Awards-Nominated for Star Trek. Nomination shared with Burt Dalton, Roger Guyett and Paul Kavanagh. Lost to Avatar.
87th Academy Awards-Nominated for Captain America: The Winter Soldier. Nomination shared with Dan DeLeeuw, Bryan Grill and Dan Sudick. Lost to Interstellar.
91st Academy Awards-Nominated for Avengers: Infinity War. Nomination shared with Dan DeLeeuw, Kelly Port, Dan Sudick. Lost to First Man.
92nd Academy Awards-Nominated for Avengers: Endgame. Nomination shared with Dan DeLeeuw, Matt Aitken, Dan Sudick. Lost to 1917.

Selected filmography
Avengers: Endgame (2019)
Avengers: Infinity War (2018)
The Cloverfield Paradox (2018)
Ant-Man (2015)
Captain America: The Winter Soldier (2014)
Red Tails (2012)
Mission: Impossible – Ghost Protocol (2011)
Super 8 (2011)
Star Trek (2009)
Transformers (2007)
Mission: Impossible III (2006)
Star Wars: Episode III – Revenge of the Sith (2005)
Pirates of the Caribbean: The Curse of the Black Pearl (2003)
Men in Black II (2002)
Harry Potter and the Sorcerer's Stone (2001)
Pearl Harbor (2001)
Star Wars: Episode I – The Phantom Menace (1999)
Deep Impact (1998)
Forrest Gump (1994)
Batman Returns (1992)
Patriot Games (1992)

References

External links

Living people
Year of birth missing (living people)
Special effects people